Kim Seong-ho (born 3 December 1964) is a South Korean modern pentathlete. He competed at the 1988 Summer Olympics.

References

1964 births
Living people
South Korean male modern pentathletes
Olympic modern pentathletes of South Korea
Modern pentathletes at the 1988 Summer Olympics